Molly Kathleen Burnett (born April 23, 1988) is an American actress, singer and producer. She is best known for portraying the role of Kelly Ann on USA's Queen of the South and the role of Melanie Jonas on the daytime soap opera, Days of Our Lives.

Burnett was nominated for a Daytime Emmy Award in the Outstanding Younger Actress in A Drama Series category in 2010 and 2012, and one for Outstanding Supporting Actress in a Digital Daytime Drama Series in 2018.

Early life
Burnett is the first born child of Katie and David Burnett, and was raised in the Denver suburb of Littleton, Colorado along with her younger brother Will.

While attending Littleton High School, she took on numerous roles at both school and theater companies in the greater Denver area. Her credits include A Midsummer Night's Dream, Noises Off, and the title role in Annie.

After graduating with honors from Littleton High School, Burnett enrolled at Wagner College, a private liberal arts school on Staten Island.[1]

Career
In 2008, Burnett landed the role of heroine Melanie Jonas on the daytime serial Days of Our Lives. In 2012, she left daytime television to pursue other roles, landing guest spots on such prime time series as CSI: NY and Major Crimes. She also landed her first movie role, portraying Ashley Bloom in the MTV Original Film Ladies Man: A Made Movie, as well as the role of Justine Gable in the Hallmark Hall of Fame film This Magic Moment. In late 2015, Burnett appeared in the multi-episode role of Nina Moore on CSI: Cyber. Burnett's indie film credits include the roles of Lex in the sci-fi thriller Ctrl+Alt+Del, Lisa in The Wedding Party, and of Southern Belle Kate Stenson in Shattered.

Burnett returned to Days of Our Lives for a six-month stint in late 2014. In mid-2016, she temporarily played the role of Maxie Jones on the daytime serial General Hospital. In mid-2018, Burnett once again stepped in for an ailing Kirsten Storms on General Hospital as Maxie Jones. In 2022, she began recurring as Detective Grace Muncy, on NBC's Law & Order: Special Victims Unit, for the show's current 24th season, before being promoted to series regular beginning with the season's seventh episode.

Filmography

Awards and nominations

References

External links

1988 births
Actresses from Colorado
American soap opera actresses
American television actresses
21st-century American actresses
Living people
People from Littleton, Colorado
Wagner College alumni